Henry Lloyd McHenry (April 3, 1910 - February 9, 1981) was an American right-handed pitcher and outfielder in Negro league baseball from 1930 to 1951.

Career
He was nicknamed "El Chato" ("Cream"). During his career he played for the Kansas City Monarchs, New York Harlem Stars, Newark Browns, Pennsylvania Red Caps of New York, New York Black Yankees, Philadelphia Stars and Indianapolis Clowns. He also played baseball in Cuba, Puerto Rico, Mexico, and other countries in Central and South America. He was born in Houston, Texas.

Charlie Biot called him a "damn good pitcher" in the book The Negro Leagues Revisited: Conversations with 66 More Baseball Heroes by Brent P. Kelley. Tom Johnson recalled in I Will Never Forget: Interviews with 39 Former Negro League Players, also by Brent P. Kelley, that Henry McHenry "was one of [the Philadelphia Stars'] stellar righthanded pitchers."

He pitched for the Minot Mallards of the ManDak League in 1951, until he was released on June 25 (record 0-1).

Henry McHenry died in Brooklyn, New York as a result of pneumonia following surgery. He is survived by his wife Guillermina, his daughters Deanna and Lydia, and two grandchildren who all live in the Atlanta, Georgia area. He is buried in Greenwood Cemetery in Brooklyn.

Notes

Other sources
Treto Cisneros, Pedro (2002). The Mexican League/La Liga Mexicana: Comprehensive Player Statistics, 1937-2001. McFarland & Company.

External links
 and Baseball-Reference Black Baseball stats and Seamheads
Negro League Baseball Players' Association

1910 births
1981 deaths
African-American baseball players
American expatriate baseball players in Mexico
Alijadores de Tampico players
Azules de Veracruz players
Baseball outfielders
Baseball pitchers
Baseball players from Houston
Charros de Jalisco players
Diablos Rojos del México players
Indianapolis Clowns players
Industriales de Monterrey players
Kansas City Monarchs players
Marianao players
Navegantes del Magallanes players
American expatriate baseball players in Venezuela
New York Black Yankees players
New York Harlem Stars players
Newark Browns players
Pennsylvania Red Caps of New York players
Philadelphia Stars players
Tuneros de San Luis Potosí players
American expatriate baseball players in Cuba
20th-century African-American sportspeople
Burials at Green-Wood Cemetery